Zdravko Rađenović (born 5 September 1952) is a Bosnian retired handball player and former president of the Olympic Committee of Bosnia and Herzegovina, who competed for Yugoslavia national handball team on two Olympic tournaments.

Career

Club
Zdravko Rađenović started his career at youth level playing for RK Sloga Doboj between 1964 and 1969. Majority of his senior years, between 1973 and 1981, Rađenović spent playing for multiple Yugoslav championships winning club RK Borac Banja Luka, leaving his mark on a team and generation that won four championships in a row.
From 1981 to 1987 he played for MTSV Schwabing.

National team
Over the years, Zdravko Rađenović was selected for the Yugoslavia national handball team on multiple occasion during his career, having important role as a player and competing at highest international levels, most notably at the 1976 Summer Olympics and 1984 Summer Olympics.

At the 1976 Olympics tournament in Montreal he was a member of the Yugoslav handball team which finished fifth. He played all six matches and scored twelve goals.

Eight years later, at the 1984 Olympics tournament in Los Angeles, he was part of the Yugoslav handball team which won the gold medal. He played all six matches and scored ten goals.

Administrative service
From 2001 to 2002 he served as the president of the Olympic Committee of Bosnia and Herzegovina.

Personal life
He was born an ethnic Serb in Bačka Palanka, Serbia, FPR Yugoslavia.

Honours

Borac Banja Luka
Yugoslav First League (5): 1972–73, 1973–74, 1974–75, 1975–76. 1980-81
Yugoslav Cup (3): 1974, 1975, 1979
European Champions Cup (1): 1976
EHF Cup (1): 1991

MTSV Schwabing
DHB-Pokal (1): 1986

External links
 

1952 births
Living people
RK Kvarner players
Yugoslav male handball players
Handball players at the 1976 Summer Olympics
Handball players at the 1984 Summer Olympics
Olympic handball players of Yugoslavia
Olympic gold medalists for Yugoslavia
Olympic medalists in handball
Bosnia and Herzegovina sports executives and administrators
People from Bačka Palanka
Medalists at the 1984 Summer Olympics
Mediterranean Games gold medalists for Yugoslavia
Mediterranean Games medalists in handball
Competitors at the 1975 Mediterranean Games
Competitors at the 1979 Mediterranean Games